The Doubt Machine: Inside the Koch Brothers' War on Climate Science is a 2016 documentary short about Koch Industries and its efforts to discredit climate research. Released by The Real News Network on October 31, it was narrated by actress Emma Thompson.

References

Documentary films about global warming
Films about media manipulation
+doubt
Koch Industries
American short documentary films
2016 short documentary films
2016 films
2010s American films